Saint Clare's Hospital may refer to:
Saint Clare's Hospital at Boonton Township, New Jersey
Saint Clare's Hospital (Manhattan), New York